The 1901 Ohio gubernatorial election was held on November 5, 1901. Incumbent Republican George K. Nash defeated Democratic nominee James Kilbourne with 52.70% of the vote.

General election

Candidates
Major party candidates
George K. Nash, Republican 
James Kilbourne, Democratic

Other candidates
E. Jay Pinney, Prohibition
Harry C. Thompson, Socialist
John H.T. Juergens, Socialist Labor
John Richardson, Union Reform

Results

References

1901
Ohio
Gubernatorial